Paulus Traudenius (? in Gouda – 9 July 1643 in Batavia, Dutch East Indies) was the Dutch Governor of Formosa from 1640 to 1643.

Traudenius was a descendant of a family of teachers in Gouda. His grandfather, also Paulus Traudenius, was in 1573 the first rector of the local Latin school after the reformation and had Latinized his original name Trudens to Traudenius. In 1630 grandson Traudenius is registered as a merchant for the Dutch East India Company in Tayouan on Taiwan. In 1633 he became a head merchant at Quinam, but  was also active along the coast of China, in the Pescadores and on Taiwan. He married twice, in April 1633 in Batavia with Elisabeth de Meester from Rotterdam, and in 1641 at Fort Zeelandia with Adriana Quina, widow of the former governor of Taiwan, Johan van der Burg. In 1643 he was recalled from Formosa to Batavia, where he soon thereafter died.

Acts as governor
Two years after the Dutch established Fort Zeelandia in southern Taiwan, the Spanish responded by establishing a fort at Santissima Trinidad in 1629 and Fort Santo Domingo in 1629. By 1641 the Spanish had become such an irritant to the Dutch in the south that it was decided to take northern Taiwan from the Spanish by force. In the usual courteous terms, Traudenius informed the Spanish governor of their intentions.

The Spanish governor was not inclined to give in so easily, and replied in kind.

Subsequently, on 24–27 November 1641, the Dutch launched an assault on the northern regions, but the Spanish positions were well-defended and the attacking troops were not able to breach the walls of the fortresses. They returned, thwarted, to Fort Zeelandia, but a second attack in 1642 was effective and the Spanish abandoned their bases on Formosa.

Sources

Year of birth missing
1643 deaths
Colonial governors of Dutch Formosa
People from Gouda, South Holland